Hansjörg Durz (born 29 July 1971) is a German politician from the Christian Social Union of Bavaria. He has been a member of the German Bundestag since 2013. He represents Augsburg-Land.

Political career
Prior to moving to national politics, Durz was Mayor of the city of Neusäß.

Since the 2013 election, Durz has since been a member of the Committee on Economic Affairs and Energy as well as of the Committee on the Digital Agenda. On the Committee on Economic Affairs and Energy, he his parliamentary group's rapporteur on telecommunication and digital policy. Since 2018, Durz has been serving as deputy chairman of the Committee on the Digital Agenda.

Other activities
 Augsburg University of Applied Sciences, Member of the Board of Trustees
 IT-Gründerzentrum GmbH, Member of the Supervisory Board
 Kreissparkasse Augsburg, Member of the Supervisory Board
 Brunnhuber Sozialstiftung, Member of the Board of Trustees

References

1971 births
Living people
Politicians from Augsburg
Members of the Bundestag for Bavaria
Members of the Bundestag 2021–2025
Members of the Bundestag 2017–2021
Members of the Bundestag 2013–2017
Members of the Bundestag for the Christian Social Union in Bavaria